Ornithobacterium is a genus of Gram-negative, microaerophilic, rod-shaped bacteria from the family Weeksellaceae (formerly Flavobacteriaceae.). It comprises two known species, O. hominis and O. rhinotracheale. Both species inhabit the respiratory tract: O. hominis is found in the human nasopharynx and O. rhinotracheale in the trachea of wild and domesticated birds

References 

Flavobacteria
Bacteria genera